Murarka College a college situated in Sultanganj, Bhagalpur, Bihar, India. It is a constituent unit of Tilka Manjhi Bhagalpur University.

History
The college was established on 23 February 1955 by the Murarka families. In the beginning only I. A. study was included. In 1956 B.A., in 1957 B.Sc., and in 2016 B.Com & PG courses were added. On 12 July 1960 the college was included under Bhagalpur University at present T.M.B.U., Bhagalpur.

References

External links 
 

Colleges affiliated to Tilka Manjhi Bhagalpur University
Universities and colleges in Bihar
Education in Bhagalpur district
Educational institutions established in 1955
1955 establishments in Bihar